Novak Musić (born May 27, 1998) is a Serbian professional basketball player for Arka Gdynia of the Polish Basketball League.

Career 

Novak started playing basketball in the younger categories of Zvezdara M-Invest, after which he moved on to play at Mega Basket where he got through all the junior and senior categories and even participated at the Euroleague Basketball Next Generation Tournament in Rome in 2015 and in Berlin in 2016.

He was a part of the Mega Basket team that won the 2015–16 Radivoj Korać Cup in Niš, though he was only on the bench during the final game against Partizan.

After that, he was loaned to several clubs from the Basketball League of Serbia including KK Smederevo 1953, KK Beovuk 72 and OKK Beograd. In the latter, he made the biggest impact having spent two seasons with a small break in between where he played for KK Igokea where he won the Bosnian National Cup at the end of the season 2018-19 and then he played only two games for Mega Basket at the beginning of the following season, after which he returned to OKK Beograd.

In OKK Beograd during the season of 2018-19, he averaged 14.6 points per game with 3.8 rebounds and 5.0 assists. During the next season, he was even better averaging 16.0 points per game with a total of 3.8 rebounds and 4.0 assists.

Novak then went on to play in KK Podgorica and gained a place in the semifinal of the 2020–21 ABA League Second Division. After that, he played for the Polish side Arka Gdynia and had an average of 11.6 points with 3.1 rebounds and 4.7 assists during the 2021–22 PLK season.

National Team 
Novak was the member of the Serbia men's national U16 team, which played at the European Championships in Riga. Two years later he played with the U18 team in Samsun, Turkey at the European Championships after which he played at the U20 European Championships in Crete, Greece in 2017 and then in Chemnitz, Germany in 2018.

External links 
 Player Profile at eurobasket.com
 Player Profile at aba-liga.com

References

1998 births
Living people
ABA League players
Asseco Gdynia players
Basketball League of Serbia players
Basketball players from Belgrade
KK Beovuk 72 players
KK Mega Basket players
KK Igokea players
KK Podgorica players
KK Smederevo players
OKK Beograd players
Point guards
Serbian expatriate basketball people in Bosnia and Herzegovina
Serbian expatriate basketball people in Montenegro
Serbian expatriate basketball people in Poland
Serbian men's basketball players